The men's trap team competition at the 2002 Asian Games in Busan, South Korea was held on 2 and 3 October at the Changwon International Shooting Range.

Schedule
All times are Korea Standard Time (UTC+09:00)

Records

Results

References 

2002 Asian Games Report, Pages 644–645
Results

External links
Official website

Men Shotgun T T